Harpalyce maisiana is a species of flowering plant in the family Fabaceae. It is found only in Cuba.

References

Brongniartieae
Flora of Cuba
Vulnerable plants
Taxonomy articles created by Polbot